Ida Grönkvist is a Swedish world champion bridge player. Her brother Mikael is also a bridge player. Ida is a lawyer and lives in Stockholm.

Bridge accomplishments

Wins
 Venice Cup (1) 2019
 World Junior Teams Championship Under 21 (1) 2014
 World Junior Teams Championship Under 26 (1) 2018
 North American Bridge Championships (2)
 Machlin Women's Swiss Teams (1) 2016 
 NABC+ Mixed Swiss Teams (1) 2018

Runners-up
 Venice Cup (1) 2017
 North American Bridge Championships (2)
 Machlin Women's Swiss Teams (1) 2017 
 Roth Open Swiss Teams (1) 2019

References

External links
 
 
 Ida Gronkvist at Bridge Winners

Swedish contract bridge players
Living people
1995 births